Cephalonyx is a genus of filamentous acritarchs known from the Precambrian and early Cambrian (and possibly other times).

References

Ediacaran fossil record
Cambrian fossil record
Acritarch genera